Robert Glen Linderholm (October 19, 1933 – July 6, 2013) was an American amateur astronomer who discovered several asteroids. He lived in Cambridge, Nebraska where he had a private observatory, Lime Creek.

List of discovered minor planets

References

1933 births
2013 deaths
American astronomers
Discoverers of asteroids

People from Cambridge, Nebraska